Southwest Airlines Flight 2294 (WN2294/SWA2294) was a scheduled US passenger aircraft flight which suffered a rapid depressurization of the passenger cabin on July 13, 2009. The aircraft made an emergency landing at Yeager Airport (CRW) in Charleston, West Virginia, with no fatalities or major injuries to passengers and crew. An NTSB investigation found that the incident was caused by a failure in the fuselage skin due to metal fatigue.

Incident

The aircraft involved was a Boeing 737-3H4 N387SW, serial number 26602, operating a scheduled flight between Nashville, Tennessee (KBNA), and Baltimore, Maryland (KBWI). At about 5:45 pm Eastern Standard Time, the aircraft experienced a rapid decompression event, causing the cabin altitude warning to be activated in the cockpit, indicating a dangerous drop in cabin pressure. Passenger oxygen masks deployed automatically. The aircraft systems disengaged the autopilot, and the captain began an emergency descent to bring the aircraft down into denser air to prevent passenger hypoxia. The flight crew then landed the aircraft safely at Charleston, West Virginia (KCRW).

Investigation
The accident was investigated by the Federal Aviation Administration (FAA) and the National Transportation Safety Board (NTSB). NTSB review of the cockpit voice recorder records, and post-incident interviews, showed that the flight crew acted appropriately in response to the emergency. The NTSB investigation found that the incident was caused by a metal fatigue crack in the fuselage skin. The aircraft was delivered to Southwest Airlines in June 1994, and at the time of the accident flight, had accumulated approximately 42,500 takeoff/landing cycles, and 50,500 airframe hours. Highly magnified inspections found that a long metal fatigue crack had developed at the boundary of two different manufacturing processes used by Boeing in creating the fuselage crown skin assembly. Boeing finite element modeling had suggested that stress forces in this boundary region are higher due to differences in stiffness, indicating that a failure was more likely to occur in this area after a certain number of pressurization-depressurization cycles. Following this incident, on September 3, 2009, Boeing issued a Service Bulletin calling for repetitive external inspections to detect any cracks in this more-vulnerable area of the fuselage skin. The FAA then followed up by issuing an Airworthiness Directive on January 12, 2010, mandating these inspection requirements.

Earlier criticism of the carrier's lax maintenance and inspection practices, for which the airline had been fined $7.5 million in 2008, was quickly echoed.

On April 1, 2011, less than two years later, a strikingly similar incident occurred on Southwest Airlines Flight 812, involving another Southwest Airlines Boeing 737-3H4. In response to the second incident, the FAA issued an Airworthiness Directive requiring more frequent inspections by all airlines operating Boeing 737 Classic aircraft.

Notes

References

External links

Southwest Airlines information regarding Flight 2294, official blog

Airliner accidents and incidents in West Virginia
2009 in West Virginia
Aviation accidents and incidents in the United States in 2009
Accidents and incidents involving the Boeing 737 Classic
2294
Airliner accidents and incidents caused by in-flight structural failure
July 2009 events in the United States